Rafael Ramos may refer to:

Rafael Ramos (boxer) (born 1965), Puerto Rican boxer
Rafael Ramos (cyclist) (born 1911), Spanish cyclist
Rafael Ramos (footballer) (born 1995), Portuguese footballer 
Rafael Ramos (police officer) (1974–2014), one of the two officers killed in the 2014 killings of NYPD officers
Rafael Coello Ramos (1877–1967), Honduran composer
Raffael Ramos (soccer agent) (born 1986), Brazilian soccer agent